This is a list of people to have served as Lord Lieutenant of the city of Londonderry (originally formally "County of the City of Londonderry", later the "County Borough of Londonderry").

County of the City of Londonderry
William Tillie: 20 February 1900 – 1904
The 5th Earl of Leitrim: 29 June 1904 – February 1921
Thomas Fitzpatrick Cooke: 1 March 1921 – 1926
William Maxwell Scott Moore: 26 November 1926 – 1939

County Borough of Londonderry
Sir Basil McFarland, 2nd Bt.: 20 September 1939 – 1975
Thomas Fitzpatrick Cooke: 13 June 1975 – 1985
James Eaton: 15 April 1986 – 2002
Donal Keegan: 2 August 2002 – 8 October 2013
Angela Garvey: 9 October 2013 – March 2022
Ian Crowe MBE: 12 January 2023 - Present

See also
 Lord Lieutenant of County Londonderry

References

 
Politics of Derry (city)
Londonderry City